Urbano Rivera (1 April 1926 – July 2002) was a Uruguayan football midfielder who played for Uruguay in the 1954 FIFA World Cup. He also played for Danubio F.C. Rivera died in July 2002 at the age of 76.

References

External links
 

1926 births
2002 deaths
1954 FIFA World Cup players
Association football midfielders
Danubio F.C. players
Uruguay international footballers
Uruguayan footballers
Uruguayan Primera División players